Urubatão Calvo Nunes (31 March 1931 – 24 September 2010), simply known as Urubatão, was a Brazilian footballer and manager. Mainly a defensive midfielder, he could also play as a central defender.

Urubatão had his playing career mainly associated with Santos. As a manager, he worked mostly in the São Paulo state, notably managing América-SP four times.

Playing career

Club
Born in Rio de Janeiro, Urubatão joined the youth setup of Bonsucesso in 1947. He signed his first professional contract in 1950, and moved to Santos in 1954.

Urubatão moved abroad in 1961, signing for Club América. He returned to his home country, and represented Jabaquara and Ponte Preta before retiring in 1965, aged 34.

International
Urubatão played one match for the Brazil national football team, a 1–2 Roca Cup loss against Argentina at the Maracanã Stadium on 7 July 1957.

Managerial career
After retiring Urubatão became a manager, with his first Série A side being Fortaleza in 1974 and 1976. He returned to Santos in 1977, coaching the club in 26 matches.

Urubatão was subsequently in charge of a number of clubs, notably managing América-SP on five occasions, Portuguesa, Sport Recife, Londrina (where he won the 1981 Campeonato Paranaense), Goiás and Coritiba, but mainly worked in the São Paulo state.

Death
Urubatão died on 24 September 2010, aged 77, due to a brain tumor.

Career statistics

International

Honours

Player
Santos
Campeonato Paulista: 1955, 1956, 1958, 1960
Torneio Rio – São Paulo: 1959

Manager
Londrina
Campeonato Paranaense: 1981

References

External links
Futebol de Goyaz profile 

1931 births
2010 deaths
Footballers from Rio de Janeiro (city)
Brazilian footballers
Association football defenders
Bonsucesso Futebol Clube players
Santos FC players
Jabaquara Atlético Clube players
Associação Atlética Ponte Preta players
Club América footballers
Brazil international footballers
Brazilian expatriate footballers
Brazilian expatriate sportspeople in Mexico
Expatriate footballers in Mexico
Brazilian football managers
Campeonato Brasileiro Série A managers
Fortaleza Esporte Clube managers
América Futebol Clube (SP) managers
Santos FC managers
Associação Portuguesa de Desportos managers
Ferroviário Atlético Clube (CE) managers
Marília Atlético Clube managers
Sport Club do Recife managers
Londrina Esporte Clube managers
Goiás Esporte Clube managers
Coritiba Foot Ball Club managers
Esporte Clube Noroeste managers
Rio Branco de Andradas Futebol Clube managers
União São João Esporte Clube managers
Grêmio Esportivo Catanduvense managers
Esporte Clube XV de Novembro (Piracicaba) managers
Associação Esportiva Araçatuba managers
Grêmio Esportivo Sãocarlense managers
Nacional Atlético Clube (SP) managers
Uberlândia Esporte Clube managers
Deaths from brain cancer in Brazil
Ituano FC managers